North Township is one of ten townships in Marshall County, Indiana, United States. As of the 2010 census, its population was 4,321 and it contained 1,754 housing units.

North Township was established in 1836.

Geography

Cities, towns, villages
 La Paz

Unincorporated towns
 Harris at 
 Linkville at 
(This list is based on USGS data and may include former settlements.)

Cemeteries
The township contains at least three cemeteries: Fairmount, Mount Zion (County Line), and White.  Fairmount is the oldest cemetery in Marshall County, established in 1834.  The first white child in Marshall County is buried at Fairmount. A Potowatomi Indian child is also buried in the cemetery.

Major highways

School districts
 Union-North United School Corporation

Political districts
 Indiana's 2nd congressional district
 State House District 17
 State Senate District 9

References
 
 United States Census Bureau 2008 TIGER/Line Shapefiles
 IndianaMap

External links
 Indiana Township Association
 United Township Association of Indiana
 City-Data.com page for North Township

Townships in Marshall County, Indiana
Townships in Indiana